Fabian Stenzel (born 7 October 1986) is a German footballer who plays for ZFC Meuselwitz.

References

External links

1986 births
Living people
FC Rot-Weiß Erfurt players
Chemnitzer FC players
ZFC Meuselwitz players
3. Liga players
German footballers
Association football defenders
Association football midfielders
People from Lüneburg
Footballers from Lower Saxony